Gorg may refer to:

Iran
 Gorg, Hamadan, Iran
 Gorg, Hirmand, Sistan and Baluchestan Province, Iran

Spain
 Gorg, Badalona, a neighbourhood in Badalona, Catalonia, Spain
 Gorg station, a metro and tram station serving the area

Other uses
 Mount Gorg, in the Alborz, a mountain range in northern Iran
 Gorgs, characters on the television series Fraggle Rock
 Galyn Görg (1956–2020), American actress